Lent term named for Lent, the six-week fasting period before Easter, is the name of the winter academic term at the following British universities:

University of Cambridge
Canterbury Christ Church University
University of Lancaster
University of Liverpool
London School of Economics and Political Science
Swansea University

and was the name of the autumn term at the University of Sydney before it swapped over to the two semester system in 1989. It was also formerly used at King's College London, University of Kent, Exeter University, University of Wales, Lampeter, University of Wales, Aberystwyth and Heythrop College, University of London.

The term runs from January to March and thus corresponds to Hilary term at Oxford and Dublin, and Epiphany term at Durham. At Sydney, it ran from March to May (10th to 22nd Mondays of the year).

Schools
Schools in the United Kingdom which use the name 'Lent term' include:
Abingdon School
 Amesbury School
Barnard Castle School
Berkhamsted School
Bloxham School
Bradfield College
Brentwood School
Brighton College
Bromsgrove School
Clifton College
Christ's Hospital
Dean Close School
Downside School
Dulwich College
Epsom College
Eton College
Exeter Cathedral School
Forest School
Gresham's School
Highgate School
Hull Collegiate School
Hurstpierpoint College
King's College, Taunton
King's School, Canterbury
King's School, Gloucester
King's School, Rochester
King Edward VI School, Stratford-upon-Avon
Lancaster Royal Grammar School
Lancing College
Lincoln Minster School 
Liverpool College
Longridge Towers School
Manchester Grammar School
Marlborough College
Oswestry School
Old Buckenham Hall School
Prior Park College
Repton School
Royal Grammar School, Worcester
Ruthin School
Sevenoaks School
Sexey's School
Sherborne School
Sherborne School for Girls
Shrewsbury School
St Benedict's School
St Columba's College
St. Edmund's College (Ware)
St Helen & St Katharine
St Lawrence College, Ramsgate
Sutton Valence School
The London Oratory School
Tonbridge School
Trent College
Westminster Cathedral Choir School
Warwick School
Wellingborough School
Whitgift School

See also
Michaelmas term
Epiphany term
Hilary term
Summer term
Trinity term
Easter term

References

Further reading
 
 
 University of Sydney, Calendar Archive

Academic terminology
Lancaster University
Terminology of the University of Cambridge
Educational time organization